John Tu (born August 12, 1941) is a Chinese-American billionaire businessman and philanthropist. He is the co-founder of Kingston Technology.

Early life
John Tu was born in Chongqing, China. He was the son of an official in China's Nationalist government. He moved to Shanghai with his parents in 1945, before going to Taiwan two years later as the Chinese civil war neared the coast. John felt totally lost at school. He describes himself as a mediocre student unable to attend the best Chinese colleges. Therefore, John moved in 1960 to Germany. He wanted to study electrical engineering, but John didn't know how to speak German. He knew how to speak a few sentences in English. So after several weeks, he went out on the street to find someone who spoke English. A biker led him to a priest who had lived in China, and sent him to a language school in Munich. In Germany at that time, a two-year apprenticeship was required for everyone, so he worked at a shipbuilding factory. After working there for two years, he studied electrical engineering at the Department of Electrical Engineering and Information Technology of the Technische Hochschule Darmstadt in Germany and graduated in 1970. He then went to work for Motorola in Wiesbaden, Germany. In 1971 he moved to California.

Career
In 1982, he co-founded Camintonn with David Sun. in 1986, they sold it for $6 million and founded Kingston Technology. In 1996, they sold 80 percent of the company to Softbank for $1.5 billion, before buying it back in 1999 for $450 million.

Philanthropy
In 2021 Tu made a donation to the Western Iowa Journalism Foundation that enabled the Pulitzer Prize-winning Storm Lake (Iowa) Times to buy its local competition and a weekly in an adjoining county. He has supported Erin Gruwell's Freedom Writers and the Freedom Writers Foundation. In 2011, he donated $1.2 million to give every first year medical student at UC Irvine an iPad.

Personal life
He is married with two children and plays drums with his band, JT and California Dreamin'.

References

Living people
American billionaires
American computer businesspeople
American electrical engineers
American philanthropists
Chinese emigrants to the United States
Businesspeople from California
People from Rolling Hills, California
Businesspeople from Chongqing
1941 births
Technische Universität Darmstadt alumni
Chinese expatriates in Germany